Viscount of Almocadén is a hereditary title in the Peerage of Spain, granted in 1926 by Alfonso XIII to Manuel Domecq y Núñez de Villavicencio, main promoter of the sherry wine market. The title makes reference to Pago de Almocadén, an area situated in Jerez de la Frontera.

Viscounts of Almocadén (1926)

Manuel Domecq y Núñez de Villavicencio, 1st Viscount of Almocadén
Pedro Francisco Domecq y González, 2nd Viscount of Almocadén
Pedro Domecq y Zurita, 3rd Viscount of Almocadén
Manuel Alfonso Domecq y Zurita, 4th Viscount of Almocadén
Mercedes Domecq y Zurita, 5th Viscountess of Almocadén
Sofía Bolín y Domecq, 6th Viscountess of Almocadén

See also
List of viscounts in the peerage of Spain

References

Viscounts of Spain
Lists of Spanish nobility